Sestrica is a municipality located in the province of Zaragoza, Aragon, Spain. According to the 2004 census (INE), the municipality has a population of 460 inhabitants.

The Sierra de la Virgen rises above the town.

Villages
Viver de la Sierra

References

Municipalities in the Province of Zaragoza